The Men's alpine combined competition at the 1976 World Championships was held on 14 February 1976, but it was a paper race.

Results

Alpine Combined event was valid for the World Championships only. No Olympic medals were awarded for this event. Results from all three events of the 1976 Winter Olympics (downhill, slalom, and giant slalom) were translated into FIS points, and then added together to decide the outcome.

See also
 Alpine skiing at the 1976 Winter Olympics

References

External links
 Innsbruck Alpine Combined, men

Men's alpine combined